Stefan Weber (born 14 June 1970 in Salzburg) is an Austrian media researcher and writer. The mass media often call him "plagiarism hunter" (in German "Plagiatsjäger").

Biography 
Weber studied journalism and communication science at the University of Salzburg and subsequently worked in Salzburg as a journalist and university lecturer. In 2005 he completed his Habilitation at the University of Vienna.

When Weber discovered in 2005 that a Tübingen theologian, in 2004, had copied approximately half of his doctoral thesis more or less verbatim from Weber's own 1996 thesis, he launched a public media campaign to draw attention to the problem of plagiarism in academia. The Tübingen plagiarist had his doctoral degree retracted in July 2005. In addition, he received a criminal court sentence in 2007.

In 2007, Weber co-authored a Google-critical study and published the book "The Google-Copy-Paste-Syndrome".

In 2011, Weber founded with Gerhard Fröhlich (University of Linz) the "Initiative Transparente Wissenschaft" (also "AntiPlag Austria"), which operates a website on Wikia. There, suspicious cases of scientific misconduct in Austria can collaboratively be dealt with.

Public plagiarism allegations 
Weber has raised allegations against several high-profile public personalities. A media sensation was created by the allegations against the then Austrian Minister for Science and Research, Johannes Hahn (see "Discussion about his PhD thesis"), in 2007, claiming that in his doctoral thesis he had "copied page per page without proper reference".

Publications 
Monographs (in German):
 Nachrichtenkonstruktion im Boulevardmedium. Die Wirklichkeit der "Kronen Zeitung" (Passagen, Vienna, 1995), 
 Die Dualisierung des Erkennens. Zu Konstruktivismus, Neurophilosophie und Medientheorie (Passagen, Vienna, 1996), 
 Wie journalistische Wirklichkeiten entstehen ("Schriftenreihe des Kuratoriums für Journalistenausbildung", Vol. 15, Salzburg, 1999)
 Was steuert Journalismus? Ein System zwischen Selbstreferenz und Fremdsteuerung (UVK Medien, Konstanz, 2000), reviewed by Matthias Kohring
 Medien - Systeme - Netze. Elemente einer Theorie der Cyber-Netzwerke (Transcript, Bielefeld, 2001), reviewed by Alexander Görke
 Non-dualistische Medientheorie. Eine philosophische Grundlegung (UVK, Konstanz, 2005), reviewed by Armin Scholl, reviewed by Roland Graf
 So arbeiten Österreichs Journalisten für Zeitungen und Zeitschriften ("Schriftenreihe des Kuratoriums für Journalistenausbildung", Vol. 18, Salzburg, 2006)
 Das Google-Copy-Paste-Syndrom. Wie Netzplagiate Ausbildung und Wissen gefährden (Heise/"Telepolis" at dpunkt, Hannover-Heidelberg, 2007; 2nd revised edition 2009), reviewed by Dennis Deicke, reviewed by Steffen Büffel
 Die Medialisierungsfalle. Kritik des digitalen Zeitgeists (Edition Va Bene/"Eine Analyse", Vienna-Klosterneuburg, 2008), the author in talk with Britta Bürger concerning his book

Editorships (in German and English, selection):
 Was konstruiert Kunst? Kunst an der Schnittstelle von Konstruktivismus, Systemtheorie und Distinktionstheorie (Passagen, Vienna, 1999), reviewed by Christian Huck
 Theorien der Medien. Von der Kulturkritik bis zum Konstruktivismus (UVK at UTB, Konstanz, 2003; 2nd revised edition 2010), reviewed by Lars Rademacher, reviewed by Wilhelm Schwendemann, reviewed by Sven Grampp and Jörg Seifert, reviewed by Stefan Höltgen
 With Alexander Riegler (eds.): The Non-dualizing Philosophy of Josef Mitterer. Brussels-Dresden 2008, ISSN 1782-348X (Special issue of "Constructivist Foundations", http://www.univie.ac.at/constructivism/journal/3/3)
 With Alexander Riegler (eds.): Die Dritte Philosophie. Kritische Beiträge zu Josef Mitterers Non-Dualismus (Velbrück Wissenschaft, Weilerswist, 2010; 2nd edition 2011), reviewed by Peter Strasser, reviewed by Andrea Roedig
 With Alexander Riegler (eds.): Non-dualism: A Conceptual Revision? Brussels 2013, ISSN 1782-348X (Special issue of "Constructivist Foundations", http://www.univie.ac.at/constructivism/journal/8/2)

External links 

 
 Website of Stefan Weber 
 AntiPlag Austria

References

1970 births
Living people
Writers from Salzburg
People involved in plagiarism controversies